Graf von Faber-Castell is a brand of fine writing instruments from the German stationery manufacturer Faber-Castell. It includes a line of pencils, mechanical pencils, fountain pens, and rollerball pens. Currently, the Graf von Faber-Castell line includes high end writing instruments made with luxury materials such as ebony, resin, and ivory.

Pencils
Graf von Faber-Castell sells the "Perfect Pencil", a sort of pencil extender with an integrated sharper. The end of the pencil houses an eraser, and has a metal cap. Placing the pencil with the point in the extender makes it possible to then use the extender's clip on a pocket, without worrying about the pencil marking clothes or making holes. There are several versions of the Perfect Pencil, in plastic, platinum-plated metal, and sterling silver.

Graf von Faber-Castell sells 0.7mm twist action mechanical pencils. The barrel of the mechanical pencils are encased with precious woods or resins.

Pens
Graf von Faber-Castell offers a variety of fountain pens. Graf von Faber-Castell fountain pens employ a cartridge/converter filling system, which allows the pen to be filled with ink using either an ink bottle or with self-contained, hassle free cartridges.  The models offered come in a variety of finishes, such as wood, lacquered metal, amongst other finishes. Fountain pen nibs are either 18K gold nibs, or polished stainless steel with a hard-wearing iridium metal tip.

Graf von Faber-Castell also sells twist action ballpoint pens, with a similar system to its mechanical pencil. These often belong to a line of products, completing the set of fountain pens, ballpoint pens, rollerballs and mechanical pencils.

Series
There have also been variations for the casings. The classic series offers slow growth hard wood surfaces in ebony, pernambuco and grenadilla. The Intuition series offers glossy black resin, the Guilloche series offer craved dyed resin in coral, indigo, sahara, and black, as well as several woods.

"Pen of the Year"
Since 2003, the Graf von Faber-Castell line has included limited edition fountain pens named the "Pen of the Year". These are highly regarded due to their materials, fine craftsmanship and limited production. Each has a nib of 18 carat bicolor gold with a barrel of exotic materials.

 2003-2012 Natures Luxury series 
 2003 "Pen of the Year" - snakewood 
 2004 "Pen of the Year" - amber and platinum 
 2005 "Pen of the Year" - stingray leather  
 2006 "Pen of the Year" - ebony and mammoth ivory  
 2007 "Pen of the Year" - primeval fossil 
 2008 "Pen of the Year" - Indian satinwood  
 2009 "Pen of the Year" - horsehair 
 2010 "Pen of the Year" - carved carbonized leather 
 2011 "Pen of the Year" - jade, MSRP 3500 USD 
 2012 "Pen of the Year" - ancient oak 
 2014-2022 Pillars of History series 
 2014 Catherine Palace
 2015 "Sanssouci" - green Silesian serpentines 
 2016 "Schloss Schönbrunn Vienna" 
 2017 "Vikings" 
 2018 "Imperium Romanum" 
 2019 "Samurai" 
 2020 "Sparta" 
 2021 "Knights" 
 2022 "Aztec"

References

External links 
 

Fountain pen and ink manufacturers
1761 establishments in Europe